KBMW (1450 AM) is a radio station licensed to Breckenridge, Minnesota, serving the Wahpeton-Breckenridge area, owned by Robert Ingstad's I3G Media, LLC. The station airs a mix of Country Music and news, as well local content such as community calendar, funeral notices, and Swap Shop. It carries Minnesota Twins baseball coverage, updates from the American Ag Network, and plays a variety of syndicated programming at night.

Ownership Info
On March 31, 2003, the station was purchased by W-B Broadcasting for $1.2 million.

On November 30, 2012, Triad Broadcasting signed a Definitive Agreement to sell all 32 of their stations to Larry Wilson's L&L Broadcasting for $21 Million. Upon completion of the sale on May 1, 2013, L&L in turn sold the Fargo stations to Jim Ingstad, who had just sold his competing cluster to Midwest Communications. An LMA (Local Marketing Agreement) was placed so Ingstad could take immediate control of the stations, and the sale became final July 2, 2013. The sale was worth $9.5 million.

Jim Ingstad sold KBMW to daughter Brooke Ingstad's Radio Wahpeton Breckenridge, LLC effective June 1, 2016; the purchase price was $300,000. Brooke Ingstad sold KBMW and sister station KBMW-FM to cousin Robert Ingstad's I3G Media, LLC effective December 31, 2017 for $925,000.

References

External links
KBMW official website

Country radio stations in the United States
Radio stations in Minnesota
1982 establishments in Minnesota
Radio stations established in 1982